Pierre Joseph Lardinois (13 August 1924 – 16 July 1987) was a Dutch politician and diplomat of the defunct Catholic People's Party (KVP) now merged into the Christian Democratic Appeal (CDA) party and agronomist.

Lardinois applied at the Wageningen Agricultural College in June 1942 majoring in Agronomy. During the German occupation Lardinois continued his study but in March 1943 the refused to sign a loyalty oath to the German occupation authority but to escape prosecution he was forced to enlist in the Arbeitslager in the German armored production industry. Following the end of World War II Lardinois returned to the Wageningen Agricultural College and obtaining a Bachelor of Science in Agriculture degree in June 1947 before graduating with a Master of Science in Engineering degree in on 23 January 1951. Lardinois worked as an agronomist from October 1951 until February 1960 for the municipality of Purmerend from October 1951 until November 1952 and for the municipality of Eindhoven from November 1952 until February 1960. Lardinois worked as a civil servant for the Ministry of Agriculture and Fisheries as an agricultural Attaché in Londen, England from February 1960 until September 1963.

Lardinois became a Member of the House of Representatives after Victor Marijnen was appointed as Prime Minister in the Cabinet Marijnen after the election of 1963, taking office on 17 September 1963. Lardinois was selected as a Member of the European Parliament and dual served in those positions, taking office on 14 October 1963. Lardinois also became active in the public sector, in December 1964 Lardinois was appointed as a trade association executive for the North Brabant Christian Farmers' association (NCB) serving as Chairman from 1 January 1965 until 5 April 1967. After the election of 1967 Lardinois was appointed as Minister of Agriculture and Fisheries in the Cabinet De Jong, taking office on 5 April 1967. After the election of 1971 Lardinois returned as a Member of the House of Representatives, taking office on 11 May 1971. Following the cabinet formation of 1971 Lardinois continued as Minister of Agriculture and Fisheries in the Cabinet Biesheuvel I, taking office on 6 July 1971. Lardinois was also appointed as Minister for Suriname and Netherlands Antilles Affairs, taking office on 28 January 1972. The Cabinet Biesheuvel I fell just one year later on 19 July 1972 and continued to serve in a demissionary capacity until it was replaced by the caretaker Cabinet Biesheuvel II with Lardinois continuing as Minister of Agriculture and Fisheries and Minister for Suriname and Netherlands Antilles Affairs, taking office on 9 August 1972.

In December 1972 Lardinois was nominated as the next European Commissioner from the Netherlands. Lardinois was giving the portfolios of Agriculture and Fisheries in the Ortoli Commission, he resigned as  Minister of Agriculture and Fisheries and Minister for Suriname and Netherlands Antilles Affairs on 1 January 1973 and was installed as European Commissioner, serving from 6 January 1973 until 6 January 1977.

Lardinois retired after spending 13 years in national politics and became active in the private sector, in December 1976 Lardinois was appointed as CEO and Chairman of the Board of directors of the Rabobank serving from 1 January 1977 until 1 September 1986.

Lardinois was known for his abilities as a manager and policy wonk. Lardinois continued to comment on political affairs until his death from cancer at the age of 62.

Decorations

References

External links

Official
  Ir. P.J. (Pierre) Lardinois Parlement & Politiek

 

 
 

1924 births
1987 deaths
Agriculturalists
Agricultural engineers
Catholic People's Party MEPs
Catholic People's Party politicians
Commanders of the Order of Orange-Nassau
Commanders of the Order of the Netherlands Lion
Deaths from cancer in the Netherlands
Dutch agronomists
Dutch bankers
Dutch chief executives in the finance industry
Dutch civil engineers
Dutch corporate directors
Dutch European Commissioners
Dutch expatriates in Belgium
Dutch expatriates in England
Dutch expatriates in Germany
Dutch lobbyists
Dutch people of World War II
Dutch prisoners of war in World War II
Dutch Roman Catholics
Dutch trade association executives
European Union and agriculture
European Union lobbyists
Grand Officers of the Order of Leopold II
Grand Officiers of the Légion d'honneur
Knights Commander of the Order of Merit of the Federal Republic of Germany
Knights of the Holy Sepulchre
Ministers of Agriculture of the Netherlands
Ministers of Kingdom Relations of the Netherlands
Members of the House of Representatives (Netherlands)
MEPs for the Netherlands 1958–1979
Officers of the Order of Agricultural Merit
People from Eijsden-Margraten
People from Zeist
Wageningen University and Research alumni
World War II civilian prisoners
World War II prisoners of war held by Germany
20th-century Dutch businesspeople
20th-century Dutch civil servants
20th-century Dutch diplomats
20th-century Dutch engineers
20th-century Dutch politicians
European Commissioners 1973–1977